USS Hobby may refer to more than one United States Navy:

 , a destroyer in commission from 1942 to 1946
 USS William M. Hobby (DE-236), a destroyer escort converted during construction into the high-speed transport 
 , a high-speed transport in commission from 1945 to 1946

United States Navy ship names